Villa Hermosa is a town in the La Romana province of the Dominican Republic. Villa Hermosa’s population live from small businesses in the same area as electricity services, supermarkets, beauty centers and other.

References

Sources 
 – World-Gazetteer.com

Populated places in La Romana Province
Municipalities of the Dominican Republic